Jitpur is a Village Development Committee in Parsa District in the Narayani Zone of southern Nepal. At the time of the 2011 Nepal census it had a population of  5,160 people living in 952 individual households. There were 2,529 males and 2,631 females at the time of census.

References

Populated places in Parsa District